The 2003 Rally Finland (formally the 53rd Neste Rally Finland) was the ninth round of the 2003 World Rally Championship. The race was held over four days between 7 August and 10 August 2003, and was based in Jyväskylä, Finland. Ford's Markko Märtin won the race, his 2nd win in the World Rally Championship.

Background

Entry list

Itinerary
All dates and times are EEST (UTC+3).

Results

Overall

World Rally Cars

Classification

Special stages

Championship standings

Junior World Rally Championship

Classification

Special stages

Championship standings

References

External links 
 Official website of the World Rally Championship

Rally Finland
Finland
Rally